Paul Shoults (October 9, 1925 – August 20, 2011) was an American football halfback. He played for the New York Bulldogs in 1949.

He died on August 20, 2011, in Granger, Indiana at age 85.

References

1925 births
2011 deaths
American football halfbacks
Miami RedHawks football players
New York Bulldogs players